God Almighty, also known as El Shaddai, is a Judaic name for God.

God Almighty may also refer to:

 "God Almighty", a 2003 song from Soundtrack to a Revolution by The Insyderz
 "God Almighty", a 2008 song from Hello Love (Chris Tomlin album)
 "God Almighty, None Compares", a 2008 song from Church Music by David Crowder Band

See also
 Good God Almighty (disambiguation)
 El Shaddai (disambiguation)